Ala Bashir is an  Iraqi painter, sculptor  and plastic surgeon who has exhibited widely and is noted for his portrayals of the human condition.

Work
His works of art have been shown in several international  exhibitions in, for example, France (Paris, Cagnes-sur-Mer), the United Kingdom (London), Ireland (Dublin), Austria (Vienna), Germany (Bonn), Yugoslavia (Belgrade), Italy (Rome), Russia (Moscow), Qatar (Doha), Morocco (Rabat), Libya (Tripoli), India (New Delhi), Tunisia (Tunis), Egypt (Cairo), the United States (New York, 1976 American tour), Iraq (Baghdad) and currently at the American Visionary Art Museum in Baltimore-USA.
Ala Bashir earned many national and international awards, among which are the Gold Medal in the Biennale International Exhibition in Baghdad in 1988, the second prize in the International Poster Exhibition in Paris in 1983 and Iraq's highest State Award for Fine Art in 2003.

Bashir designed two historically important monuments in Baghdad: "The Union", a statue (73 feet high, made of stone, weighing 970 tons), depicting the love between man and woman. This monument was destroyed by the Iraqi Authority in February 2010. The other is "The Cry", a statue (27 feet high, made of bronze) depicting the tragedy of the Amiyria shelter, where 400 women and children were killed by an air strike in February 1991 during the First Gulf War—the monument is located close to the shelter.

See also
 Iraqi art
 Islamic art
 List of Iraqi artists

References

External links
AlaBashir.com 
 "Personal account of a chance encounter with Dr Bashir, 2007"
 "Telegraph, U.K. 2005
“Saddam’s Ear”
Al Jazeera: Saddam's doctor rebuts Iraq's story

Living people
Iraqi painters
Iraqi sculptors
Iraqi plastic surgeons
Year of birth missing (living people)